The murder of Jonathan Coulom, also referred to as the Jonathan Affair, is a French criminal case in which the 10-year-old Coulom was abducted on the night of 7 April 2004 in Saint-Brevin-les-Pins, Loire-Atlantique. His body was found, bound with a cinderblock, in a pond in Guérande on 19 May 2004. German Martin Ney, a convicted serial killer of children in Germany has been charged with the crime as of January 26, 2021. He was transferred to the French city of Nantes from his high security prison cell in Germany to stand trial for the murder of Coulom.

Biography 
Jonathan Coulom lived in Orval, Cher. He was nicknamed "Titi" and "Cowboy" by his parents Virginie and Stéphane, and had three sisters. Jonathan was abandoned by his birth father Laurent, and when his mother and stepfather got together, he was 6-months old, with Stéphane having a 1-year-old daughter of his own. Stéphane had worked as a cable installer until September 2001, when an accident resulted in him breaking his back, and Virginie was a cashier until the birth of her youngest daughter. Jonathan was a frail child: about 1.40 m. tall and just over 30 kg, and described as shy and suspicious, but still smiling. He loved motorbikes and football, and had a golden earring in his left ear.

The crime and the investigation 
Jonathan was 10 and a half, and in CM2. On 31 March 2004, he was one of 24 children from classes CM1-CM2 to leave on a school trip to the seaside resort of Saint-Brevin-les-Pins in Loire-Atlantique, for one week, in "PEP 18" summer camp. It was in the southern part of the town, bordered by the blue road and the aisle of André-Vien, in the Menhir District. At that time of year, the town was nearly deserted and half the residences were unoccupied.

Jonathan slept with five other friends in the "Pouligen" room. There was no handle on the inside of the room's door, so for safety, the door was never fully closed when someone was inside. The fence between the resort and the blue road was broken and collapsed in several places, so it was easy to get into the field and get access to the buildings.

On the evening of 6 April 2004, the group went to bed around 11 pm, because a party had been organised. In an adjacent building, another party composed of young adults celebrating their BAFA completion ended around 2 am. During his last round at midnight, the supervisor was certain that Jonathan was lying in his bed. The bus driver, who had driven the children to the centre, went to the bathroom in the night between 6 and 7 am, and found that the door of the block where Jonathan was sleeping was wide open from the outside. He then closed it.

On the following day, a little after 7 am, his disappearance was noted. Coulom was dressed only in his pyjamas, and all his belongings were in the room. The night was cold and rainy.

On 16 April, the prosecutor of Saint-Nazaire opened a judicial investigation for kidnapping and false imprisonment. Catherine Salsac then become the lawyer for Coulom's parents.

On 22 April, the German investigators of the Federal Criminal Police Office contacted the gendarmes, because the case bore similarities with those of a German serial killer, nicknamed "The Black Man", "The Hooded Man" and "The Masked Man". He was believed to have committed about 40 sexual assaults against boys in summer camps or campsites in the area. Three German boys were kidnapped and killed: 13-year-old Stefan Jahr (31 March 1992), 8-year-old Dennis Rostel (24 July 1995) and 11-year-old Dennis Klein (5 September 2001).

A witness claimed that he had seen a saloon car with German registration parked near the resort, on the exact night of Jonathan's disappearance.

A tiny patch of blood was found on a bed sheet where Jonathan was sleeping. Soon after, a big campaign of sampling and DNA profiling was carried out to no avail, as it was a false track. About 200 DNA samples were taken in 5 years, and the blood turned out to be of another child who slept in the same sheets, some time before Jonathan.

Discovery of corpse 
On the evening of 19 May 2004, Jonathan's body was found naked, bound in a fetal position and weighted down with a cinderblock in the small pond of the Porte-Calon manor house at Guérande near the former Ursuline Convent. His neck, wrists and ankles were tied with a nylon cord in the form of a precisely-made marine knot. The pond was not visible from outside the property, as it was under the windows of the manor's tenants.

The medical examiner who did the post-mortem on Jonathan's body concluded that he hadn't drowned, his body showing no bone damage or visible injury, no trace of strangulation or toxic elements, suggesting he was probably suffocated to death. His body was too degraded to be able to tell if he had been raped.

As a first step, the investigators favoured the hypothesis of a local predator because:

 the post-mortem findings made them believe that Coulom was kept alive some time before being killed;
 it had to be a "local" who knew of the resort and the mansion, and how to access them discreetly.

In April 2011, Martin Ney, a German educator arrested in Hamburg, was identified as "The Black Man". He confessed to many sexual assaults and the murders of the three German boys in 1992, 1995 and 2001, but denied killing Coulom and Verstappen. The pursuit of Ney, not being conclusive, was later abandoned.

Research has since continued on a predator operating in a dozen seaside resorts on the Atlantic coast, mainly in the area of Guérande, Saint-Brevin-les-Pins and La Turballe. He has assaulted or attempted to assault at least 30 girls and boys, aged 7 to 13, between 1982 and 1998.

In April 2018, a fellow inmate of Ney revealed that he had admitted to the kidnapping and murder of Jonathan. In January 2021, Ney was extradited to Nantes after he was charged with Coulom's murder.

See also 
List of solved missing person cases
List of unsolved murders
Nicky Verstappen

References

TV documentaries 
 "The Jonathan Coulom Affair", November 4, 2008 in Unsolved, on France 2. 
 "Deadly Holidays" (first report) in "...on the Atlantic Coast", on September 29, October 6 and 14, 2014; August 10th, 17th and 25th, 2015 in Crimes, on NRJ 12.
 "Case of the little Jonathan, the mysterious man in black" January 23, 2019, in Criminal Investigations: the magazine of news items on W9.

Radio broadcast 
 "The Jonathan Affair, ten years without answers" April 8, 2014; "The Jonathan Affair", April 10, 2018 and "The Jonathan Affair: on the trail of the Black Man", April 23, 2018 in Crime Time with Jacques Pradel, on RTL.

External links 
 Website of the Judicial Police and the Gendermerie: the Jonathan Affair in the "Call to Witness" tab

2000s missing person cases
2004 murders in France
April 2004 events in France
Deaths from asphyxiation
Formerly missing people
Male murder victims
Missing person cases in France
Unsolved murders in France